Acalyptomerus asiaticus, is a species of fringe-winged beetle found in India, Sri Lanka, Malaysia and Thailand. It is also introduced to Jamaica.

Description
Body length is about 1.06 to 1.18 mm. Both pronotum and elytra have sharp lateral margins. These margins are very finely and densely denticulate with short and fine hairs. Dorsal surface clothed with short and uniform pubescence. There is a pair of sharp radial crests on pronotal disc. Pronotal disc is convex, and coarsely punctate with very fine pubescence. Lateral margins of elytra are evenly, finely and densely denticulate. There are 17 straight, less sharp punctate lines on elytral disc. In male, aedeagus is dorso-ventrally compressed and paramere is deeply incised with pointed apices.

References 

Scirtoidea
Insects of Sri Lanka
Beetles described in 1979